Ekhaya: A Family Chronicle, also known as Molo Fish, is a South African-Canadian television drama miniseries, which aired in 1997. Created by Inner City Films and Kurira Films International for CBC Television and the South African Broadcasting Corporation, the series was based on the life of Clarence Hamilton, a Black South African who was arrested at age 18 for anti-apartheid activism and later fled into exile to Botswana, then Zimbabwe, finally settling in Canada.

The series starred David Meyer as the younger Darryl, the fictionalized version of Hamilton; Eric Miyeni as the adult Darryl; and Julie Stewart as Darryl's Canadian wife Rosa. The series was written by Hamilton, and co-directed by Hamilton, Alfons Adetuyi and Seipati Bulane-Hopa.

Ekhaya/Molo Fish begins in Canada in the fall of 1989, just prior to Nelson Mandela’s release from 27 years of political imprisonment and the repeal of apartheid. The 13 one hour long episodes chronicles the life of Darryl Malaga’s and his family as they navigate the poisonous waters of white racist rule.

Meyer received a Gemini Award nomination for Best Actor in a Drama Series at the 12th Gemini Awards.

Honourable mention Best New Dramatic Series - Geneva International Film Festival Tout Ecran, 1997.

References

External links

1997 Canadian television series debuts
1997 Canadian television series endings
CBC Television original programming
1990s Canadian television miniseries
1990s Black Canadian television series